Mohamed Ali Hassan (Somali: Maxamed Cali Xasan [Cadde Gaaboow]), known as Adde Gabow, is a Somali politician. He is the former governor of the Banaadir region and was appointed mayor of the capital Mogadishu by President Abdullahi Yusuf Ahmed on 15 January 2007.

References
 

Year of birth missing (living people)
Living people
Mayors of places in Somalia
Place of birth missing (living people)
Mayors of Mogadishu